Omar Belbachir (born 13 December 1980 in Bordeaux, France) is a French-Algerian footballer. He currently plays in the Championnat de France amateur for Stade Bordelais.

References

1980 births
Algerian footballers
French sportspeople of Algerian descent
FC Istres players
French footballers
French expatriate footballers
Expatriate footballers in Belgium
Living people
Ligue 2 players
Pau FC players
Algerian expatriates in Belgium
Oud-Heverlee Leuven players
Stade Bordelais (football) players
Association football defenders
Footballers from Bordeaux